The Cerrillos Turquoise Mines are Ancestral Puebloan turquoise mines located in the Cerrillos Hills,  southwest of Santa Fe, New Mexico. Archeologists believe that most of the turquoise found at Chaco Canyon was mined in the Cerrillos Hills. Many modern Pueblo people claim to have ancient rights to these mines. In 1977, neutron activation analysis linked an artifact from Chetro Ketl to the Cerrillos mines.

References

Bibliography

 

Colorado Plateau
Ancestral Puebloans
Archaeological sites in New Mexico